Yong-hwa is a Korean unisex given name. The meaning differs based on the hanja used to write each syllable of the name. There are 20 hanja with the reading "yong" and five hanja with the reading "hwa" on the South Korean government's official list of hanja which may be registered for use in given names.

People with this name include:
 Kim Yong-hwa (born 1971), South Korean film director
 Jung Yong-hwa (born 1989), South Korean musician, member of CNBLUE

See also
 List of Korean given names
 Cha Yong-hwa (born 1990), North Korean artistic gymnast

References

Korean unisex given names